Eli Fuchs (1924–1992) was an Israeli international football player and manager of Maccabi Haifa. Aside from managing in Israel, he has managed clubs in South Africa and Cyprus. He died at 1992 as an Arkia employee.

References 

1924 births
1992 deaths
Israeli footballers
Maccabi Tel Aviv F.C. players
Israel international footballers
Maccabi Haifa F.C. players
Israeli football managers
Maccabi Haifa F.C. managers
Maccabi Netanya F.C. managers
AC Omonia managers
Olympiakos Nicosia managers
Expatriate football managers in Cyprus
Expatriate soccer managers in South Africa
Israeli expatriate football managers in Cyprus
Israeli expatriate sportspeople in South Africa
Association football midfielders